Domnus II was the Patriarch of Antioch between 442 and 449 and a friend of the influential Bishop of Cyrrhus, Saint Theodoret.

Biography
Domnus was ordained deacon by the Patriarch Juvenal of Jerusalem in 429 AD and remained at the Monastery of St. Euthymius in Palestine for two years. In 431 AD he left the monastery to aid his uncle, Patriarch John I of Antioch, as part of the Nestorian Controversy. Domnus went to Antioch to support proponents of the School of Antioch in favour of Nestorianism against supporters of Pope Cyril of Alexandria and his successor Dioscurus.

In 442 AD, upon the death of his uncle, Domnus was elected successor with support he had acquired in Antioch. In 445 AD he summoned a synod of Syrian bishops and confirmed the deposition of Athanasius of Perrha. In 447 AD he consecrated Irenaeus to the see of Tyre (Theodoret, Epistle 110); but emperor Theodosius II, commanded that the appointment should be annulled on the grounds that Irenaeus was both a digamus and a supporter of Nestorianism. He defended Ibas, bishop of Edessa, against charges of promulgating Nestorian doctrines, and summoned a council at Antioch (448) which decided in favor of Ibas and deposed his accusers. Domnus's sentence, though revoked by Flavian, Patriarch of Constantinople, was confirmed by three episcopal commissioners to whom he and the emperor Theodosius II had committed the matter.

As a result, he was deposed at the Second Council of Ephesus on August 8, 449. Cowed by the authoritarian spirit of Dioscorus, and unnerved by the violence of Barsumas and his monks, Domnus revoked his former condemnation of Eutyches, and voted for the condemnation of Flavian, but in vain. He was the only bishop then deposed and banished who was not reinstated after the Council of Chalcedon—though this may have been by request so he could retire to his beloved monastery.

At that council Maximus II, his successor in the see of Antioch, obtained permission to assign Domnus a pension from the revenues of the church, and on his recall from exile Domnus returned to the monastic home of his youth, ending his days in the Monastery of St. Euthymius, where in 452 AD, according to Theophanes, he afforded a refuge to Juvenal of Jerusalem when he was driven from his see (Theophanes, p. 92).

References
 
 A Dictionary of Christian Biography and Literature to the End of the Sixth Century A.D., with an Account of the Principal Sects and Heresies'' by Henry Wace.

Patriarchs of Antioch
5th-century Byzantine bishops
5th-century archbishops
Nestorians